Arthur Francis Duffey (June 14, 1879 – January 23, 1955) was an American track and field athlete who competed at the 1900 Summer Olympics in Paris, France.

In 1902, whilst a student at Georgetown University, Duffey ran a world record of 9.6 seconds for the 100 yards. Although equaled in 1906 by Dan Kelly, it would be 27 years before it was finally bettered, by Eddie Tolan.

In 1905 it was rumored that he was to marry the actress Mabel Hite, and as she was a divorcee he would meet Pope Pius X in order to attain special dispensation to wed. The rumor proved false. Duffey finally married in 1911, to long-time friend Helen Louise Daley.

In 1905 he confessed that he had been accepting sponsor money since 1898, and the AAU ordered all of his records expunged. In 1908 he attempted to form the National Protective Athletic Association (NPAA) to challenge the AAU. Around this time Duffey was also involved in promoting professional athletes on the east coast racing circuit. One of those he worked with was the future Mercersburg Academy coach Jimmy Curran.

After retiring from athletics he became a sports writer for The Boston Post. He died of a heart attack.

References

Further reading

External links

 
 
 
 
 

1879 births
1955 deaths
Athletes (track and field) at the 1900 Summer Olympics
Georgetown University alumni
Northeastern Huskies baseball coaches
Olympic track and field athletes of the United States
Worcester Academy alumni
American male sprinters
USA Outdoor Track and Field Championships winners
The Boston Post people
People from Roxbury, Boston
Sportspeople from Boston